In photography, the golden hour is the period of daytime shortly after sunrise or before sunset, during which daylight is redder and softer than when the sun is higher in the sky.

The golden hour is also sometimes called the "magic hour," especially by cinematographers and photographers. During these times, the brightness of the sky matches the brightness of streetlights, signs, car headlights and lit windows.

The period of time shortly before the magic hour at sunrise, or after it at sunset, is called the "blue hour". This is when the sun is at a significant depth below the horizon, when residual, indirect sunlight takes on a predominantly blue shade, and there are no sharp shadows because the sun either has not risen, or has set.

Details

When the sun is low above the horizon, sunlight rays must penetrate the atmosphere for a greater distance, reducing the intensity of the direct light, so that more of the illumination comes from indirect light from the sky, reducing the lighting ratio. This is technically a type of lighting diffusion. More blue light is scattered, so if the sun is present, its light appears more reddish. In addition, the sun's low angle above the horizon produces longer shadows.

The term hour is used figuratively; the effect has no clearly defined duration and varies according to season and latitude. The character of the lighting is determined by the sun's altitude, and the time for the sun to move from the horizon to a specified altitude depends on a location's latitude and the time of year. In Los Angeles, California, at an hour after sunrise or an hour before sunset, the sun has an altitude of about 10–12°. For a location closer to the Equator, the same altitude is reached in less than an hour, and for a location farther from the equator, the altitude is reached in more than one hour. For a location sufficiently far from the equator, the sun may not reach an altitude of 10°, and the golden hour lasts for the entire day in certain seasons.

In the middle of the day, the bright overhead sun can create strong highlights and dark shadows. The degree to which overexposure can occur varies because different types of film and digital cameras have different dynamic ranges.
This harsh lighting problem is particularly important in portrait photography, where a fill flash is often necessary to balance lighting across the subject's face or body, filling in strong shadows that are usually considered undesirable.

Because the contrast is less during the golden hour, shadows are less dark, and highlights are less likely to be overexposed. In landscape photography, the warm color of the low sun is often considered desirable to enhance the colours of the scene. It is the best time of day for natural photography when diffuse and warm light is desired.

See also 
 Alpenglow

References

Bibliography 

 Bermingham, Alan. 2003. Location Lighting for Television. Boston: Focal Press. 
 Lynch, David K., and William Livingston. 1995. Color and Light in Nature. Cambridge: Cambridge University Press. 
 Lynch-Johnt, Barbara A., and Michelle Perkins. 2008. Illustrated Dictionary of Photography: The Professional's Guide to Terms and Techniques. Buffalo, NY: Amherst Media, Inc. 
 Singleton, Ralph S., and James A. Conrad. 2000. Filmmaker's Dictionary. 2nd ed. Ed. Janna Wong Healy. Hollywood, California: Lone Eagle Publishing Company. 
 Thomas, Woodlief, ed. 1973. SPSE Handbook of Photographic Science and Engineering. New York: John Wiley and Sons.

External links 

 Golden Hour Calculator
 Twilight Calculator – Blue Hour / Golden Hour Table
 Golden Hour Photography: A Landscape Photographer's Guide

Aesthetic beauty
Aesthetics
Atmospheric optical phenomena
Beauty
Cinematic techniques
Cinematography
Concepts in aesthetics
Dawn
Earth phenomena
Evening
Filmmaking
Film production
Landscape photography
Parts of a day
Photography